The December 1187 papal election (held on 19 December) was convoked after the death of Pope Gregory VIII. It resulted in the election of Cardinal Paolo Scolari, who took the name of Clement III.

Verona and Ferrara

Alberto di Morra, as papal chancellor, had followed Pope Lucius III in his flight from the Roman campagna, to seek aid from the Emperor Frederick Barbarossa in Verona. Negotiations between the two quickly broke down, and the pope and his court found themselves trapped in Verona by a hostile emperor.  Frederick besieged the pope in Verona, forbidding appeals to the pope from anyone in his domains, and obstructing appeals from elsewhere. Anyone apprehended in an attempt to reach the papal curia or returning from it was imprisoned and subjected to torture. Lucius died during the siege on 25 November 1185. His successor was Humbertus Crivelli, the Archbishop of Milan and Cardinal of S. Lorenzo in Damaso, " a violent and unyielding spirit, and a strong opponent of Frederick (Barbarossa)," in the words of Ferdinand Gregorovius. He took the name Urban III, and maintained all of the uncompromising policies of Lucius III. Urban III continued the hostilities with the emperor, offering no concessions, and finally arriving at the decision to excommunicate him. He was deterred only by the urgent pleas of the people of Verona. Urban and the cardinals who were besieged with him were able to escape from Verona in the last weeks of September 1187, taking refuge in Ferrara. Urban died there on 20 October 1187.

On the following day thirteen cardinals who had been present in Ferrara began the proceedings to elect his successor. The cardinals were aware that the papal chancellor, Albert di Morra, was in great favor with the Emperor Frederick Barbarossa, because he was a member of the imperial party in the curia, and because he reported to the emperor all the confidential activities of the Roman curia. On 21 October 1187 he was unanimously elected pope and took the name Gregory VIII.

Pope Gregory immediately began to reverse the anti-imperial policies of his predecessors. He announced that King Henry would be given an imperial coronation. The emperor Frederick immediately cancelled his blockade of the papal curia, and announced that Pope Gregory and his curia were free to go wherever they wished. Henry ordered Leo de Monumento, the Roman consul, and the German Count Anselm to conduct the pope safely to wherever he wished to go. Gregory travelled to Bologna (18–20 November 1187), Modena (22 November), Reggio Emilia (24 November), Parma (26–29 November), Lucca (7–9 December), and finally Pisa (10–17 December).

Participants
At the death of Gregory VIII there were probably only 20 cardinals. Basing on the countersigning of the papal bulls in December 1187 it is possible to establish that at least 9 cardinals were present  at Pisa at the death of Gregory VIII:

Five electors were created by Pope Lucius III, three by Pope Alexander III, one by Pope Lucius II.

Absentee cardinals
Probably eleven cardinals were absent:

{| class="wikitable sortable" style="width:100%"
!  width="*" | Elector
!  width="*" | Place of birth
!  width="*" | Cardinalatial title
!  width="*" | Elevated
!  width="*" | Elevator
!  width="*" | Notes
|- valign="top"
|Konrad von Wittelsbach
|Bavaria
|Bishop of Sabina and Archbishop of Mainz
| 18 December 1165 
|Alexander III
|[[Dean of the Sacred College of Cardinals|prior cardinalium]];
|- valign="top"
|Henri de Marsiac, O.Cist.
|Château de Marcy, France
|Bishop of Albano
|March 1179
|Alexander III 
|Papal legate in Germany
|- valign="top"
|Joannes Anagninus (Giovanni dei Conti di Anagni)
|Anagni
|Priest of S. Marco
|1158/1159
|Adrian IV
|Protopriest
|- valign="top"
|Ruggiero di San Severino
|San Severino
|Priest of S. Eusebio and Archbishop of Benevento
|Ca. 1178-1180
|Alexander III
|
|- valign="top"
|Guillaume aux Blanches Mains
|France
|Priest of S. Sabina and Archbishop of Reims
|March 1179
|Alexander III
|Minister of State of the Kingdom of France
|- valign="top"
|Albino, C.R.S.F.
|Gaeta (?)
|Priest of S. Croce in Gerusalemme
|18 December 1182
|Lucius III
|Future bishop of Albano (1189-1197)
|- valign="top"
|Pandolfo
|Lucca
|Priest of SS. XII Apostoli
|18 December 1182
|Lucius III 
| 
|- valign="top"
|Adelardo Cattaneo
|Verona
|Priest of S. Marcello
|16 March 1185
|Lucius III 
|Future bishop of Verona (1188-1214)
|- valign="top"
|Soffredo
|Pistoia
|Deacon of S. Maria in Via Lata
|18 December 1182
|Lucius III
|Papal legate in France
|- valign="top"
|Bobo
|Rome
|Deacon of S. Angelo in Pescheria
|18 December 1182
|Lucius III
|Papal legate in France
|- valign="top"
|Gerardo
|Lucca
|Deacon of S. Adriano
|18 December 1182
|Lucius III
|Papal Vicar
|}

Seven absentees were created by Lucius III, three by Alexander III, and one by Adrian IV.

Death of Gregory VIII and election of Pope Clement III
Pope Gregory VIII died at Pisa of a brief illness, said to have been a fever lasting eight days, on 17 December 1187. He had been pope only one month and twenty-seven days.

Two days later the cardinals assembled in the cathedral of Pisa, and began proceedings to elect his successor. Cardinal Pietro Scolari had to be carried to the cathedral from the Hospitium Sancti Pauli de ripa Arni. The election was celebrated in the presence of the Consul of Rome, Leo de Monumento. The cardinals unanimously elected Cardinal Paolo Scolari, bishop of Palestrina, on 19 December 1187, the Saturday after the Feast of S. Barbara. He accepted his election and took the name Clement III. On 20 December, he was solemnly crowned by protodeacon Giacinto Bobone Orsini,

Immediate arrangements were begun for a return to Rome. Without delay Pope Clement sent his legates to the Roman people, in order to formulate a firm peace between him and them. Orders were issued to the papal chamberlain, Cencius Camerarius, to receive the oaths of office of the ostiarii of the Lateran palace, which was carried out on 22 January; the  also issued instructions for their service. On 26 January 1188, Pope Clement was in Siena, and by 11 February 1188 he returned to Rome and was resident at the Lateran.S. Miranda Cardinal Paolo Scolari 

Notes

Sources
 Gregorovius, Ferdinand (1896). The History of Rome in the Middle Ages'' Vol. IV, part 2. London: George Bell 1896.

Papal elections
12th-century elections
1187
12th-century Catholicism
1187 in Europe